Cosmina Stratan (born 20 October 1984) is a Romanian film actress. She is best known for her performance as Voichița in Beyond the Hills.

Selected filmography

Awards
Best Actress Award at the 2012 Cannes Film Festival (with Cristina Flutur).

References

External links
 	

	

1984 births
21st-century Romanian actresses
Living people
Actors from Iași
Romanian child actresses
Romanian film actresses
Cannes Film Festival Award for Best Actress winners
Caragiale National University of Theatre and Film alumni